Sweet Girl may refer to:

Film
The Sweet Girl, a 1926 German silent film directed by Manfred Noa
Sweet Girl, a 1953 Cantonese music film starring Yam Kim-fai
Sweet Girl (film), an American action thriller film directed by Brian Andrew Mendoza

Music
"Sweet Girl", song by Stevie Nicks and Fleetwood Mac from The Dance, 1997
Sweet Girl (EP), by Korean boy group B1A4, 2015
"Sweet Girl", the Korean-language title track from the EP, 2015
"Sweet Girl", song by Beware of Darkness from Orthodox, 2013

Other
Sweet Girl, horse ridden by Roger Moeremans d'Emaüs 1920
Sweet Girl, horse, winner of the Prix Thomas Bryon 1960